Broughton is an English surname and placename. It has two claimed origins as a name.

As a placename
According to M. Leon Broughton, author of Broughton Memoirs (Copyright 1962, Second Edition):

"The name Broughton is often derived from the Saxon “Broc”, which means brook or broken land; and “Tun”, the dwelling or town.  In King Ethelred’s charter to the monastery of Shaftesbury, England, 1001 AD, Elfwig’s boundaries at Broctun are mentioned.  The Domesday Book of William the Conqueror, 1086 AD, describes thirty-four manors of Broctun, variously Latinized by the clerks of the records to: Brochthon, Brocton, Brotton, Broton, Brogton, and Broughton, perhaps according to the pronunciation peculiar to the localities where the manors where situated.

Later the spelling of Broughton seems to have generally been adopted.  There are about twenty distinct parishes besides hamlets and different localities in England that bear the name; and it is locally applied to a small parish in Canada, to an island in the Alatamaha river in Georgia, and also occurs in the states of South Carolina, Texas, and some of the New England states.  The Broughtons are now widespread throughout the United States, and the world."

Broughton may also come from an Old English word meaning 'stronghold'. It is also likely to be derived from “berg” (a hill), and “ton” (a town), both Saxon words.

This is the case in Lincolnshire, England. At this Broughton, the mound is near the west end of the village and may have been the site of a Roman station Pretorium from about 400 AD. Many Roman coins, bricks, tiles and other artifacts have been found in the area. In the Domesday Book of 1086, the name appears as Bertone. [A Dictionary of English Place-Names, A. D. Mills, Oxford University Press, 1991]

Places

Broughton as a surname

People

Broughton is the surname (or family name) of many notable people:
 Alan Broughton (born 1936), American poet
 Alfred Broughton (1902–1979), British politician
 Alice Willson Broughton (1889–1980), First Lady of North Carolina
 Andrew Broughton (1602/3 – 1687), English jurist
 Bruce Broughton (born 1945), American composer
 Carrie Lougee Broughton (1879–1957), American librarian
 Cortez Broughton (born 1997), American football player
 David Thomas Broughton (born 1981), English folk & experimental musician
 Drewe Broughton (born 1978), English footballer
 Gayle Broughton (born 1996), New Zealand rugby player
 Greg Broughton (born 1986), Australian Rules Footballer
 Hugh Broughton (1549–1612), English scholar and theologian
 Irving Broughton, American publisher, writer, filmmaker, and teacher
 Jack Broughton (1703–1789), English bare-knuckle fighter
 Jack Broughton (RAF officer), British Royal Air Force officer
 James Broughton (1913–1999), American poet and poetic filmmaker
 Jodie Broughton (born 1988), English rugby player
 John Broughton (born 1952), Australian astronomer
 Joseph Melville Broughton (1888–1949), governor of North Carolina
 Len G. Broughton (1865–1936), American evangelical and author
 Luther Broughton (born 1974), American football player
 Matthew Broughton (1880–1957), English footballer
 Mel Broughton (born 1960), British animal rights activist
 Needham B. Broughton (1848–1914), American businessman and politician
 Nehemiah Broughton (born 1982), American football player
 Peter Broughton (born 1935), English cricketer
 Rhoda Broughton (1840–1920), Welsh novelist
 Richard Broughton (priest) (c. 1558 – 1634), English Catholic priest and antiquarian
 Richard Broughton (MP) (1524–1604), English politician
 Rob Broughton (born 1983), English mixed martial arts fighter
 Sir Robert Broughton (died 1506), soldier and MP
 Robert Broughton (born 1950), Canadian computer programmer and activist
 Robert Broughton (cricketer) (1816–1911), English cricketer
 Robyn Broughton, New Zealand netball coach
 Roger Broughton, Canadian comic book publisher
 Roger Broughton (cricketer) (1958–2004), New Zealand cricketer
 Ross Broughton, Canadian psychologist
 Spence Broughton (c. 1746–1792), English highwayman
 Ted Broughton (1925–2016), English footballer
 T.R.S. Broughton (1900–1993), Canadian classical scholar
 Urban H. Broughton (1857–1929), English engineer, railroad executive, and politician
 William R. Broughton (1762–1821), British naval officer
 Bishop William Broughton (1788–1853), Australian religious leader
 Willie Broughton (born 1964), American football player

Peerage
It is also used as part of the title of some British Peers and baronets.

 Baron Marks of Broughton
 Baron Broughton
 Broughton baronets

Fictional characters 
 Lorraine Broughton, the titular character from the 2017 film "Atomic Blonde" and its 2012 comic origin "The Coldest City"

References

English-language surnames
English toponymic surnames